The 1981–82 Iowa Hawkeyes men's basketball team represented the University of Iowa as members of the Big Ten Conference. The team was led by head coach Lute Olson, coaching in his 8th season at the school, and played their home games on campus at the Iowa Field House in Iowa City.

In the last three games of the regular season, all losses, two went to overtime and the third was by a point.

The Hawkeyes received an at-large bid to the NCAA tournament as the sixth-seed in the West Regional.

Roster

Schedule/results

|-
!colspan=8 style=| Non-Conference Regular Season
|-

|-
!colspan=8 style=| Big Ten Regular Season

|-
!colspan=8 style=| NCAA Tournament

Rankings

References

External links
Sports Reference – 1981–82 Iowa Hawkeyes basketball season

Iowa
Iowa
Iowa Hawkeyes men's basketball seasons
Hawkeyes
Hawkeyes